Sexual Dependency (original Spanish title Dependencia sexual) is a Bolivian drama film by . It focuses on five young people just beginning to construct their sexual identity. Most of the actors featured were non-professional. It was Bolivia's entry to the foreign film category of the 76th Academy Awards.

Awards

 Critics Prize, Locarno International Film Festival
 Special Mention Jeonju International Film Festival
 Nomination for Best Film, Golden Precolumbian Circle Bogota Film Festival

References

External links 
 

2003 LGBT-related films
2003 films
Bolivian drama films
Bolivian LGBT-related films
2000s coming-of-age drama films
2000s English-language films
2000s Spanish-language films
Films set in the United States
American drama films
LGBT-related drama films
2003 drama films
2000s American films